Oskar Osala (born 26 December 1987) is a Finnish former professional ice hockey player. He played in three National Hockey League (NHL) games with the Washington Capitals and Carolina Hurricanes and represented Finland in Olympic Winter Games 2018.

Playing career
He started his career with Vaasa-based Sport. He made his North American debut with the OHL's Mississauga IceDogs in 2005, and was drafted 97th overall in the fourth round of the 2006 NHL Entry Draft by the Washington Capitals.

In the 2007–08 season, he returned to Finland where he played for the Espoo Blues of the SM-liiga; made his debut with the senior national team; and was named SM-liiga rookie of the year.

Osala signed a three-year contract with the Capitals in June 2008, and was assigned to Washington's AHL affiliate in Hershey. On 10 December 2008, Osala made his NHL debut replacing the injured Tomáš Fleischmann in the Caps' 3-1 win over the Boston Bruins, playing two games before being returned to the Bears.  Osala finished the season with the Hershey Bears' Calder Cup winning team, scoring two goals in Game 1 of the Calder Cup Finals.

On 3 March 2010, Osala was traded with Brian Pothier to the Carolina Hurricanes for Joe Corvo. Osala made a brief NHL appearance with Carolina shortly after the trade, but spent most of the remainder of the season with the Albany River Rats.

Unable to find a role with the Hurricanes and subsequently assigned to AHL affiliate the Charlotte Checkers for the duration of the following season, Osala signed a one-year contract with Russian team Neftekhimik Nizhnekamsk of the Kontinental Hockey League (KHL) on 25 May 2011.

On 10 December 2013, during the 2013–14, his third with Neftekhimik, Osala was traded to division competitors Metallurg Magnitogorsk. He contributed 6 assists in the post-season to help Metallurg claim their first Gagarin Cup.

Osala played 5 seasons with Metallurg, which won a second Gagarin Cup in the 2015–16 campaign, before opting to leave the KHL following the 2017–18 season.

Citing a lack of drive, Osala sat out the beginning of the 2018–19 season as a free agent. On 12 November 2018, Osala opted to end his hiatus and agreed to a one-year contract for the remainder of the season in returning to his homeland with Oulun Kärpät of the top flight Liiga.

International play
Osala shared the goal scoring title in 2007 IIHF World Junior Championships.  Osala scored five goals in six games for Finland, sharing the lead with four other players.

Career statistics

Regular season and playoffs

International

Awards and honors

References

External links

1987 births
Albany River Rats players
Carolina Hurricanes players
Charlotte Checkers (2010–) players
Espoo Blues players
Finnish expatriate ice hockey players in Russia
Finnish expatriate ice hockey players in the United States
Finnish ice hockey left wingers
HC Neftekhimik Nizhnekamsk players
Hershey Bears players
Living people
Metallurg Magnitogorsk players
Mississauga IceDogs players
Ice hockey players at the 2018 Winter Olympics
Olympic ice hockey players of Finland
Oulun Kärpät players
Sportspeople from Vaasa
Vaasan Sport players
Washington Capitals draft picks
Washington Capitals players